Mwadi Mabika (born July 27, 1976) is a retired Congolese-American basketball player. She was an All-Star in the Women's National Basketball Association (WNBA).

She studied biology and chemistry at the Massamba School in Kinshasa.

She was brought to the United States by NBA star and fellow Zairean Dikembe Mutombo, who personally appealed to the government officials in Zaire for permission to bring her to the U.S.

Mabika represented Zaire at the 1996 Summer Olympics.

For six seasons prior to joining the WNBA, Mabika played for the Tourbillon club in Kinshasa.

She played for the Los Angeles Sparks during the WNBA's inaugural season in 1997.  Mabika helped guide the Sparks to consecutive championships in 2001 and 2002.

She won a silver medal with the Democratic Republic of the Congo at the 2003 All-Africa Games.

In December 2005, she again represent the DR Congo's women's national basketball team - known as Simba Ladies - at the 2005 FIBA Africa Championship for Women.

In February 2008, she signed a free agent contract with the Houston Comets.

Mabika became a U.S. citizen in 2011.

Career statistics

Regular season

|-
| style="text-align:left;"|1997
| style="text-align:left;"|Los Angeles
| 21 || 1 || 15.5 || .390 || .184 || .542 || 2.6 || 1.0 || 1.1 || 0.3 || 1.3 || 6.0
|-
| style="text-align:left;"|1998
| style="text-align:left;"|Los Angeles
| 29 || 23 || 24.5 || .339 || .308 || .698 || 4.4 || 1.5 || 1.0 || 0.3 || 1.3 || 8.2
|-
| style="text-align:left;"|1999
| style="text-align:left;"|Los Angeles
| 32 || 28 || 29.3 || .372 || .281 || .718 || 4.8 || 3.5 || 1.4 || 0.5 || 1.8 || 10.8
|-
| style="text-align:left;"|2000
| style="text-align:left;"|Los Angeles
| 32 || 32 || 29.4 || .388 || .384 || .820 || 5.6 || 3.1 || 1.8 || 0.6 || 1.6 || 12.3
|-
| style="text-align:left;background:#afe6ba;"|2001†
| style="text-align:left;"|Los Angeles
| 28 || 24 || 29.6 || .387 || .382 || .861 || 4.6 || 3.1 || 1.4 || 0.4 || 1.6 || 11.2
|-
| style="text-align:left;background:#afe6ba;"|2002†
| style="text-align:left;"|Los Angeles
| 32 || 32 || 32.8 || .423 || .366 || .839 || 5.2 || 2.9 || 1.2 || 0.3 || 1.9 || 16.8
|-
| style="text-align:left;"|2003
| style="text-align:left;"|Los Angeles
| 32 || 30 || 32.6 || .407 || .264 || .866 || 4.4 || 2.6 || 0.9 || 0.6 || 2.3 || 13.8
|-
| style="text-align:left;"|2004
| style="text-align:left;"|Los Angeles
| 31 || 31 || 31.1 || .415 || .404 || .824 || 3.9 || 2.4 || 1.2 || 0.1 || 1.6 || 14.4
|-
| style="text-align:left;"|2005
| style="text-align:left;"|Los Angeles
| 17 || 14 || 21.6 || .320 || .224 || .500 || 1.6 || 1.7 || 0.9 || 0.0 || 0.8 || 5.8
|-
| style="text-align:left;"|2006
| style="text-align:left;"|Los Angeles
| 32 || 32 || 21.2 || .377 || .333 || .889 || 2.0 || 1.5 || 0.6 || 0.2 || 1.2 || 8.5
|-
| style="text-align:left;"|2007
| style="text-align:left;"|Los Angeles
| 33 || 23 || 23.1 || .364 || .310 || .754 || 3.8 || 2.2 || 0.9 || 0.1 || 2.2 || 8.1
|-
| style="text-align:left;"|2008
| style="text-align:left;"|Houston
| 20 || 11 || 16.4 || .303 || .274 || .714 || 1.9 || 0.9 || 0.5 || 0.0 || 0.6 || 4.6
|-
| style="text-align:left;"|Career
| style="text-align:left;"|12 years, 2 teams
| 339 || 281 || 26.3 || .385 || .327 || .799 || 3.9 || 2.3 || 1.1 || 0.2 || 1.6 || 10.5

Playoffs

|-
| style="text-align:left;"|1999
| style="text-align:left;"|Los Angeles
| 4 || 4 || 31.8 || .378 || .176 || .000 || 4.5 || 2.8 || 3.3 || 0.3 || 2.5 || 9.3
|-
| style="text-align:left;"|2000
| style="text-align:left;"|Los Angeles
| 4 || 4 || 34.0 || .543 || .531 || .750 || 5.3 || 1.0 || 1.5 || 1.0 || 1.3 || 17.5
|-
| style="text-align:left;background:#afe6ba;"|2001†
| style="text-align:left;"|Los Angeles
| 7 || 7 || 33.0 || .318 || .250 || .786 || 6.6 || 2.4 || 1.0 || 0.9 || 1.4 || 9.0
|-
| style="text-align:left;background:#afe6ba;"|2002†
| style="text-align:left;"|Los Angeles
| 6 || 6 || 35.3 || .378 || .320 || .692 || 6.8 || 4.2 || 1.3 || 0.2 || 1.7 || 14.7
|-
| style="text-align:left;"|2003
| style="text-align:left;"|Los Angeles
| 9 || 9 || 38.2 || .438 || .353 || .846 || 5.6 || 2.3 || 1.6 || 0.2 || 2.2 || 14.3
|-
| style="text-align:left;"|2004
| style="text-align:left;"|Los Angeles
| 3 || 3 || 35.7 || .370 || .350 || .938 || 2.7 || 3.3 || 2.3 || 0.0 || 2.0 || 18.7
|-
| style="text-align:left;"|2005
| style="text-align:left;"|Los Angeles
| 1 || 1 || 11.0 || .250 || .000 || .000 || 0.0 || 0.0 || 0.0 || 0.0 || 2.0 || 2.0
|-
| style="text-align:left;"|2006
| style="text-align:left;"|Los Angeles
| 5 || 4 || 28.0 || .388 || .433 || .706 || 4.0 || 2.0 || 1.4 || 0.0 || 1.6 || 15.4
|-
| style="text-align:left;"|Career
| style="text-align:left;"|8 years, 1 team
| 39 || 38 || 33.5 || .400 || .350 || .769 || 5.2 || 2.5 || 1.6 || 0.4 || 1.8 || 13.4

References

External links
Basketball-reference page on Mabika
 WNBA Player Profile
 WNBA Interview

1976 births
Living people
Basketball players at the 1996 Summer Olympics
Olympic basketball players of the Democratic Republic of the Congo
Democratic Republic of the Congo women's basketball players
Democratic Republic of the Congo expatriate basketball people in the United States
Houston Comets players
Los Angeles Sparks players
Basketball players from Kinshasa
Shooting guards
Democratic Republic of the Congo expatriates in the United States
Women's National Basketball Association All-Stars
African Games silver medalists for DR Congo
African Games medalists in basketball
Undrafted Women's National Basketball Association players
Competitors at the 2003 All-Africa Games